Caudal is one of 8 comarcas administrative divisions of Asturias,   an autonomous community in Spain.

The comarca of Caudal is divided into three municipalities. They are:
Lena
Aller
Mieres

Comarcas of Asturias